Juan Mondiola is a 1950 Argentine comedy film directed by Manuel Romero and starring Juan José Miguez, Elina Colomer and Laura Hidalgo.

The film's sets were designed by Álvaro Durañona y Vedia.

Cast
 Elina Colomer 
 Mauricio Espósito 
 Pilar Gómez 
 Laura Hidalgo 
 Juan José Miguez 
 Rodolfo Onetto 
 Pedro Pompillo 
 Juan José Porta 
 Fernando Siro

References

Bibliography
 César Maranghello. Breve historia del cine argentino. Celesa, 2005.

External links
 

1950 films
1950 comedy films
Argentine comedy films
1950s Spanish-language films
Argentine black-and-white films
Films directed by Manuel Romero
1950s Argentine films